Bighorn is an unincorporated settlement and locality in the Thompson Canyon in British Columbia, Canada.  It is a few miles south of Spences Bridge, British Columbia.  The name originated as the name of a whistlestop on the Canadian Pacific Railway  and is a reference to the heyday of big game hunting in the area, where Bighorn Sheep were once abundant and the region around Spences Bridge was one of the foci of the hunting industry in British Columbia.

Thompson Country
Populated places in the Thompson-Nicola Regional District
Unincorporated settlements in British Columbia